Fotr may refer to:

 Fot, runemaster who flourished in mid-11th century Sweden
 Fótr, the thegn memorialized by the Norra Härene Runestone